Taunton by-election may refer to:

 1701 Taunton by-election
 1724 Taunton by-election
 1754 Taunton by-election
 1873 Taunton by-election
 1880 Taunton by-election
 1887 Taunton by-election
 1909 Taunton by-election
 1912 Taunton by-election
 1921 Taunton by-election
 1956 Taunton by-election